"(We're Off on the) Road to Morocco" is a song composed in 1942 by Jimmy Van Heusen, with lyrics by Johnny Burke, for the film Road to Morocco, in which it was performed by Bing Crosby and Bob Hope. Crosby recorded a solo version of the song, with different lyrics, on June 10, 1942 with Vic Schoen and his orchestra. Subsequently, on December 8, 1944,  Crosby and Hope recorded a duet version which reached the No. 21 position in the Billboard charts briefly in July 1945.

The song was included as #95 in AFI's 100 Years...100 Songs.

The song was also recorded by Rosemary Clooney and Jack Sheldon for Clooney's 1994 album Still on the Road.

References

Film theme songs
Songs about Morocco
Bob Hope songs
Bing Crosby songs
Songs with music by Jimmy Van Heusen
Songs with lyrics by Johnny Burke (lyricist)
Songs written for films
1942 songs